The CIS Tower is an office skyscraper on Miller Street in Manchester, England. As of 2023, the Grade II listed building is Manchester's 10th-tallest building and the tallest office building in the United Kingdom outside London. The tower remained as built for over 40 years, until maintenance issues on the service tower required an extensive renovation, which included covering its façade in photovoltaic panels.

Location
The tower is situated on Miller Street, which forms the Manchester Inner Ring Road, and stands adjacent to New Century House, a high-rise office building also designed by Gordon Tait and G. S. Hay and constructed concurrently for the CIS's parent company, the Co-operative Wholesale Society (CWS). The plot on which the building stands had been heavily bombed during World War II and subsequently cleared. The site chosen for CIS Tower and New Century House was one of two areas of land offered by the local authority; the other site was in Piccadilly, but this came with the condition that any development scheme had to include shops and a hotel. Not wishing to compromise their autonomy, the CIS board chose the Miller Street site.

Opposite the tower sits One Angel Square, which opened in 2013 and serves as the headquarters of the Co-operative Group (the successor to the CWS). The complex of buildings form NOMA (a portmanteau of 'North Manchester'), a  area of land previously known as the Co-operative Estate. The area was developed by the Co-operative Group in a joint venture with Hermes Investment Management. In 2017, the Co-operative Group sold its stake in NOMA to Hermes Investment Management in order to focus on its core retail business, however, it remains a tenant in several buildings. More than 6,500 people work in the neighbourhood.

Design

Form
The office tower building rises above a five-storey podium block. The tower element consists of the steel-framed main office building and a windowless reinforced concrete service tower. The service tower rises higher than the main office block and houses lifts and stairwells. 

The building has a symmetrical plan, with the main tower rising up from the north-eastern end of the podium block and projecting at the front over the first two floors and the main entrance. The service tower is attached to the centre of the main tower's south-west side, forming a squat T-shape. In total, the building has  of floor area, with clear open spaces on the office floors.

Façade
Both the office tower and podium feature glass curtain walls with metal window frames. Black vitreous enamel panels demarcate the floor levels. The building materials, glass, enamelled steel and aluminium, were chosen so that the building could remain clean in the polluted Manchester atmosphere.

The tower's concrete service shaft, which rises above the office tower, has two bands of vents at the top and was clad in a mosaic made up of 14 million centimetre-square grey tesserae. designed to shimmer and sparkle.

Interiors 
A green bronze-like, abstract mural sculpted by William Mitchell made from fibreglass covers the entrance hall's rear wall. Interiors were designed by Misha Black of the Design Research Unit. The executive areas are delineated by the use of teak and cherry wood veneers.

Development

Planning
The CIS board of directors decided that a new headquarters was needed to accommodate its 2,500 staff, who were dispersed in 10 different buildings across Manchester. In January 1953, CIS General Manager Robert Dinnage told his board to begin planning a new head office and that year entered into initial discussions with Manchester Corporation (now Manchester City Council). The design brief for the building, devised by Dinnage, was threefold: to convey the prestige of the CIS and the co-operative movement; to improve the appearance of Manchester in which the Society was one of the largest financial organisations; and to provide first-class accommodation for the staff.

The CIS board formed a chief office premises sub-committee to oversee the project. A deputation of appointed architects, designers and directors travelled to Italy, the United States and Canada to examine contemporary office design. The tower's design was influenced by Skidmore, Owings & Merrill's Inland Steel Building in Chicago after a visit by the architects in 1958. Having viewed the Inland Steel Building, the project team decided to aim for clear unbroken floors unobstructed by lift shafts and toilets to provide maximum flexibility.

In 1958, the company proposed building an office tower block, designed by G.S. Hay, chief architect of the CWS with Gordon Tait of Sir John Burnet, Tait and Partners.

Construction
Construction began in September 1959 and was completed in 1962 at a cost of £3.98 million (equivalent to approximately £86.8 million in 2020). The main contractors for the CIS Tower were John Laing Construction Ltd, with A.E. Beer as the structural engineering consultant, and O. Castick, Chief Engineer of CWS as the engineering services consultant.

The CIS Tower was officially opened by Prince Philip, Duke of Edinburgh on 22 October 1962. At , the tower overtook the Shell Centre as the tallest building in the United Kingdom, a title it retained for a year until it was replaced by the Millbank Tower in London. It remained the tallest building in Greater Manchester until it was surpassed by the Beetham Tower in 2006.

Renovation

Within six months of construction, some of the mosaic tiles on the service tower became detached owing to cement failure and lack of expansion joints in the concrete. Although the tower was granted listed building status in 1995, falling tiles were an ongoing problem. English Heritage had to be consulted as alterations could change the building's appearance.

In 2004, CIS consulted Solarcentury with a view to replacing the deteriorating mosaic with 575.5 kW of blue building-integrated photovoltaic (PV) cells which would generate approximately 180,000 kWh (average of 20 kW) of electricity per year. The work was completed by Arup and at that time was the largest commercial solar façade in Europe. The PV cells made by Sharp Electronics began feeding electricity to the National Grid in November 2005. 

The project, which cost £5.5 million, was partly funded by the Northwest Regional Development Agency which granted £885,000 and the Energy Savings Trust at the Department of Trade and Industry (DTI) contributed £175,000. The solar power project was chosen by the DTI as one of the "10 best green energy projects" of 2005.

Critical reception and listed status
Upon its completion, the tower was praised by the architectural press and was awarded the Bronze Medal by the Royal Institute of British Architects in 1962. In the 1990s, it was granted Grade II listed building status by English Heritage. The tower, described as "the best of the Manchester 1960s office blocks", was listed for its "discipline and consistency".

See also

 Listed buildings in Manchester-M60
 Building-integrated photovoltaics
 List of tallest buildings and structures in Manchester

References
References

Bibliography

Skyscrapers in Manchester
Photovoltaics
Office buildings completed in 1962
The Co-operative Group
Skyscraper office buildings in England
Grade II listed buildings in Manchester
Modernist architecture in England
International style architecture in England